The Western Maricopa Education Center (West-MEC) is a joint technological education district based in Maricopa County, Arizona, United States. It provides career and technical education services to ten school districts in the West Valley of Phoenix.

Member school districts
Agua Fria Union High School District
Buckeye Union High School District
Deer Valley Unified School District
Dysart Unified School District
Glendale Union High School District
Paradise Valley Unified School District
Peoria Unified School District
Saddle Mountain Unified School District
Tolleson Union High School District
Wickenburg Unified School District

External links
 

School districts in Maricopa County, Arizona